Thottakurichi Muthuswamy Nallaswamy (2 September 1924 to 30 September 2005) popularly known as T.M.N was an Indian politician and Member of the Legislative Assembly of Tamil Nadu. He was elected to the 2nd, 3rd & 4th Madras State Legislative Assemblies later renamed Tamil Nadu Legislative Assembly as an Indian National Congress candidate from Karur constituency in the Madras State Legislative Assembly elections in 1957, 1962 and 1967.

TMN is remembered for his achievements in the implementation of several agriculture irrigation & development schemes in Karur constituency, and obtaining sanction for establishing numerous government schools for the first time in Tiruchirappalli District in the 1950s and 1960s. He took great initiative in the agricultural development of his constituency, with the cause of farmers, being his prime endeavor and key purpose in public life.

Early life 
Nallaswamy, was born in an agricultural family in 1924 at Thottakurichi, a village near Karur, Tamil Nadu, India (the then Madras Presidency) as the second child to M. Muthuswamy Gounder and wife Raasaayi Ammal. His paternal grandfather was Malayanna Gounder. He completed his schooling in 1940, obtaining his secondary school-leaving certificate at Municipal High School, Karur. He then moved to Trichy to study the "intermediate" course at St.Joseph's College, Trichy which he could not complete due to family circumstances.

Career 

TMN's political career began in 1952 when he contested in the Madras State Legislative Assembly election from Aravakurichi Constituency which he lost to N. Rathina Gounder.

TMN then served as president, District Board, Tiruchirappalli district (comprising the present Trichy, Ariyalur, Perambalur, Karur districts) from 1954 to 1957. During his tenure as MLA in 1962, TMN was chairman, Tamil Nadu Legislature House Committee on Estimates.

He served as secretary, Tamil Nadu Sugarcane Growers Federation and was founder, Pugalur Sugarcane Growers Association, Trichy District. He also served as chairman, Tiruchirappalli District Co-operative Spinning Mills, Karur 1964 to 1967.

TMN's mentor and guiding light was Chief Minister K.Kamaraj who trusted him for his personal integrity, sincerity and track record of efficiently implementing & delivering social development schemes for the people.  Due to this Chief Minister K.Kamaraj nominated TMN as candidate in consecutive state legislature elections (1952, 1957, 1962, 1967) to serve the community.

References 

Indian National Congress politicians from Tamil Nadu
2005 deaths
1924 births